The Malagasy black swift (Apus balstoni) or Madagascar swift, is a species of swift in the family Apodidae.
It is endemic to Madagascar and the Comoro Islands.

Habitat
Its natural habitats are subtropical or tropical moist lowland forests and subtropical or tropical moist montane forests.

Subspecies
 A. b. balstoni – Madagascar
 A. b. mayottensis – Comoro Islands

References

Malagasy black swift
Birds of the Comoros
Birds of Madagascar
Malagasy black swift
Taxa named by Edward Bartlett
Taxonomy articles created by Polbot